The Macintosh 512K enhanced (512Ke) was introduced in April 1986 as a cheaper alternative to the top-of-the-line Macintosh Plus, which had debuted three months previously.  It is the same as the Macintosh 512K but with the 800K disk drive and 128K of ROM used in the Macintosh Plus. Like its predecessors, it has little room for expansion. Some companies did create memory upgrades that brought the machine up to 2 MB or more.

Model differences
Originally, the case was identical to its predecessor,  except for the model number listed on the  rear bucket's agency approval label. It used the same beige-like color as well. But like the Macintosh Plus, in 1987 the 512Ke adopted the standard Apple "Platinum" color, as well as the same case-front design as the Plus (without the name), though keeping its original rear bucket. Later in its lifespan, the 512Ke was discounted and offered to the educational market, badged as the Macintosh ED (M0001D & later M0001ED).

The 512Ke shipped with the original short Macintosh Keyboard, but the extended Macintosh Plus Keyboard with built-in numeric keypad could be purchased optionally. A version of the 512Ke only sold outside of North America included the full keyboard and was marketed as the Macintosh 512K/800. Later, the larger keyboard would be included as standard in North America as well.

Although the 512Ke includes the same 128K ROMs and 800K disk drive as the Mac Plus, the 512Ke retains the same port connectors as the original Mac.  For this reason, 512Ke users' only hard disk option is the slower, floppy-port-based Hard Disk 20, or similar products for the serial port, even though the 512Ke ROMs contain the "SCSI Manager" software that enables the use of faster SCSI hard disks (because the ROMs are the same as the ones used in the Mac Plus, which does have a SCSI port).  Apple did point users to certain third-party products which could be added to the 512Ke to provide a SCSI port (Apple copied the MacSCSI design in the Mac Plus logic board).

Official upgrades
A Macintosh 512K could be upgraded to a 512Ke by purchasing and installing Apple's $299 Macintosh Plus Disk Drive Kit. This included the following:
 800 KB double-sided floppy disk drive to replace the original 400 KB single-sided drive
 128 KB ROM chips to replace original 64 KB ROM
 Macintosh Plus System Tools disk with updated system software
 Installation guide
One further upgrade made by Apple replaced the logic board and the rear case (to accommodate the different port configuration) with those of the Macintosh Plus, providing built-in SCSI functionality and up to 4 MB RAM. Because Apple's official upgrades were costly, many third-party manufacturers offered add-on SCSI cards, as well as RAM upgrades, to achieve the same functionality. The new ROM allowed the computer to run much newer system and application software; though it loaded more data into RAM, it only slightly decreased the amount of available memory – by 1.5 KB – leaving well over 370 KB available for applications.

System software
After June 1986, the 512Ke shipped with System 3.2. After it was discontinued, Apple changed the recommended OS for the 512Ke to System 4.1.  System 6.0.8 is the maximum OS for the 512Ke.

Timeline

See also
 Macintosh 128K/512K technical details

References

External links

Inside the Macintosh 512K

512ke
512ke
Computer-related introductions in 1986